Augustian may refer to:

 Related to Caesar Augustus or his era
 Augustan (disambiguation)
 A misnomer for Augustinian religious orders associated with Saint Augustine